Queens is a 2005 film directed by Manuel Gómez Pereira.

The story follows a group of men who will be marrying in Spain's first same-sex wedding ceremony, and their mothers, who will be attending.

Plot
Magda (Carmen Maura) is the manager of a posh resort hotel in Madrid which will be the site of a mass same-sex marriage ceremony.  One of the grooms is Magda's son Miguel (Unax Ugalde), a designer, who will marry his boyfriend Óscar (Daniel Hendler), son of Ofelia (Betiana Blum), who is "visiting" from Argentina with her dog...

Nuria (Verónica Forqué), a sex addict, is also on her way to attend the ceremony. Her son Narciso (Paco León) will be marrying his boyfriend Hugo (Gustavo Salmerón), whose own parents, Helena (Mercedes Sampietro) and Hector (Tito Valverde), are less enthusiastic.

Meanwhile, actress Reyes (Marisa Paredes) will be attending to watch her son Rafa (Raúl Jiménez) marry his boyfriend Jonas (Hugo Silva), the son of her gardener Jacinto (Lluís Homar).

Cast

Reception
Queens received mixed reviews from critics. Rotten Tomatoes gives the film an approval rating of 43% from 30 critics.

Andre Soares of Alt Film Guide notes "cheesy commercialism and sentimentality aside, Reinas boasts a couple of first-rate performances" and it "delivers more than a few good laughs". Anthony Mardon of abusdecine.com remarks that the "director has managed to bring together the muses of Pedro Almodovar" and "the film enjoys, indeed, irresistible and colorful moments, but the rhythmic, too sawtooth, and some situations vaudevillesques, pulled by the hair, spoil the coherence".
Thomas G. Deveny states in his book 'Migration in Contemporary Hispanic Cinema' in 2012, "it has international stars and casts them as immigrants in a world of luxury".

See also 
 List of Spanish films of 2005

References

External links
 

Films shot in Madrid
Spanish LGBT-related films
Films directed by Manuel Gómez Pereira
2005 romantic comedy films
2005 films
Spanish romantic comedy films
2005 LGBT-related films
LGBT-related romantic comedy films
2000s Spanish films
2000s Spanish-language films